Borneogena antigrapha is a species of moth of the family Tortricidae. It is found on Borneo.

References

Archipini
Endemic fauna of Borneo
Moths described in 1941
Moths of Borneo
Taxa named by Alexey Diakonoff